Jason Stein is an American college baseball coach and former middle infielder. He is the hitting and infield coach for Duke University. He played college baseball at Eastern Kentucky University from 1992 to 1995 for head coach Jim Ward. He was the head baseball coach for Eastern Kentucky University from 2009 to 2015

Playing career
Stein played at Eastern Kentucky, known as a defensive specialist.  In his sophomore campaign, the second baseman batted .378 and earned the OVC batting title.  He remained among conference leaders in his junior year, and moved to shortstop for his senior season.  Serving as co-captain, Stein earned first team All-Conference, striking out just five times while collecting 76 hits.  He played one season with the independent Anderson Lawmen before returning to Richmond as a student assistant coach while finishing his degree.

Coaching career
After spending the 1996 season as a student assistant, Stein was promoted to a full-time assistant coach for the 1997 season.  He spent four seasons on the staff of head coach Jim Ward.  In 1998, he was named recruiting coordinator.  After the 2000 season, Stein moved to Belmont as an assistant coach and recruiting coordinator.  In 2009, he returned to Eastern Kentucky as head coach.

Head coaching record

References

External links

Living people
Anderson Lawmen players
Baseball players from Kentucky
Belmont Bruins baseball coaches
Eastern Kentucky Colonels baseball coaches
Eastern Kentucky Colonels baseball players
Year of birth missing (living people)